Baaitse Elizabeth "Bess" Nkabinde (born 1959 in Silwerkrans) is a former judge on the Constitutional Court of South Africa.

Early life 
Nkabinde (née Motsatsi) was born in 1959 in Silwerkrans, in what was then the western Transvaal (and is now part of the North West province). She matriculated at Mariasdal High School in Tweespruit in 1979. Thereafter she obtained a BProc degree at the University of Zululand in 1983, an LLB from the North-West University in 1986, and a Diploma in Industrial Relations at Damelin College in 1988.

She worked as a legal adviser to the Bophutatswana government for four years, before becoming an advocate in 1988. She worked at the North West Bar for ten years before her first appointment as an acting judge in 1999.

Judicial career 
In November 1999, Nkabinde was appointed to the Bophuthatswana division of the High Court of South Africa. She served acting stints on the Labour Court, Labour Appeal Court, and, in 2005, the Supreme Court of Appeal. She also chaired the Rules Board.

In 2006, Nkabinde was appointed to the Constitutional Court of South Africa by then President Thabo Mbeki to replace Arthur Chaskalson. Her appointment proved controversial, since, despite being "relatively obscure" and lacking experience in constitutional law, she was preferred to Wits law professor Cora Hoexter, who seemed the much stronger candidate. Nkabinde is known for her controversial judgments in S v Masiya, Lee v Minister of Correctional Services, and Botha v Rich, each of which has attracted severe criticism.

Hlophe controversy 
In 2008, High Court judge John Hlophe allegedly approached Nkabinde and Chris Jafta to persuade them to find for President Jacob Zuma in pending litigation. The Constitutional Court laid a public complaint against Hlophe which Jafta and Nkabinde supported. Six years later, however, when the misconduct enquiry against Hlophe was pending, Jafta and Nkabinde brought a court challenge to the tribunal's jurisdiction, saying their own complaint was not legally valid. Commentators slammed Jafta and Nkabinde's "cowardice", which had brought the Constitutional Court into disrepute. The judges claimed, in response, that they were simply upholding the Constitution. The High Court dismissed the judges' application on 26 September 2014, but they appealed. The Supreme Court of Appeal dismissed that appeal in March 2016, criticising Jafta and Nkabinde's damaging court application and implying that the case raised questions about their "integrity". On 6 April 2016, Jafta and Nkabinde filed an appeal to the Constitutional Court – their own court – asking it to overturn the Supreme Court of Appeal's judgment. They did so partly on the basis that the SCA made "hurtful" imputations about them. All this was despite the fact, as one commentator noted, that the Constitutional Court already held in 2012 that it cannot hear appeals in the Hlophe matter and that any SCA judgment is final.

Personal life 
Nkabinde is married and has four children.

References

1959 births
Living people
South African women judges
Judges of the Constitutional Court of South Africa
South African women in politics
Constitutional court women judges